Mueang Sisaket is the capital district (amphoe mueang) of Sisaket Province, northeastern Thailand.

History
The district was renamed from Klang Si Sa Ket (กลางศีร์ษะเกษ) to Mueang Sisaket in 1913. In 1917 mueang was removed from the name, which was added again in 1938.

Geography
Neighboring districts are (from the north clockwise) Yang Chum Noi, Kanthararom, Nam Kliang, Phayu, Wang Hin, Uthumphon Phisai and Rasi Salai.

Administration
The district is divided into 18 sub-districts (tambons), which are further subdivided into 166 villages (mubans). The town (thesaban mueang) Sisaket covers tambons Mueang Nuea and Mueang Tai and parts of tambon Nong Khrok, Phon Kha, Ya Plong, and Pho. Nam Kham is a subdistrict municipality (thesaban tambon) which covers the whole same-named subdistrict. There are a further 15 tambon administrative organizations (TAO).

Missing numbers are tambons which now form the districts Wang Hin and Phayu.

References

External links 
amphoe.com (Thai)

Mueang Sisaket